The Convent may refer to:

 The Convent (Gibraltar), the official residence of the governor of Gibraltar
 The Convent (USCA), a housing co-op
 The Convent (1995 film), a Portuguese drama film
 The Convent (2000 film), an American horror film
 The Convent (2018 film), a British horror film
 The Convent (television series), 2006 BBC sequel to The Monastery
 Convent (Mesa), a sandstone butte in Utah

See also

 Convent (disambiguation)